Sickle Nunatak is a nunatak at the north side of the entrance to Jupiter Valley, on the east side of the Morozumi Range. So named by members of the New Zealand Geological Survey Antarctic Expedition (NZGSAE), 1967–68, because of its shape.

Further reading 
 J. A. S. Dow & V. E. Neall (1974), Geology of the Lower Rennick Glacier, Northern Victoria Land, Antarctica, New Zealand Journal of Geology and Geophysics, 17:3, 659–714, https://doi.org/10.1080/00288306.1973.10421588 PP 683, 686

External links 

 Sickle Nunatak on USGS website
 Sickle Nunatak on the Antarctica New Zealand Digital Asset Manager website
 Sickle Nunatak on AADC website
 Sickle Nunatak on SCAR website

References 

Nunataks of Victoria Land
Pennell Coast